The PowerPC e6500 is a multithreaded 64-bit Power ISA-based microprocessor core from Freescale Semiconductor (now part of NXP). e6500 will power the entire range of QorIQ AMP Series system on a chip (SoC) processors which share the common naming scheme: "Txxxx". Hard samples, manufactured on a 28 nm process, available in early 2012 with full production later in 2012.

Design 
It has a revised memory subsystem compared to the previous e5500 core with four cores combined into a CPU Cluster, sharing a large L2 cache and the e6500 cores supports up to eight CPU Clusters for very large multiprocessing implementations. The core is the first multithreaded core designed by Freescale and reintroduces an enhanced version of AltiVec to their products. The multithreading allows for two virtual cores per hard core and is organized as 2x2-way superscalar. One virtual core in an e6500 can often perform better than an entire e5500 core since Freescale essentially duplicated a lot of logic instead of just virtualizing it, in addition to other enhancements to the core.

Each core has five integer units (four simple and one complex), two load-store units, one 128-bit AltiVec unit, 32+32 kB instruction and data L1 caches. Speeds range up to 2.5 GHz, and the core is designed to be highly configurable via the CoreNet fabric and meet the specific needs of embedded applications with features like multi-core operation and interface for auxiliary application processing units (APU).

e6501 

The e6501 core is a revision introduced in 2013 with enhanced virtualization interrupt support.

Products 
 QorIQ AMP Series T4240 as the first processor revealed with 12 cores followed by T2080 and T2081 with four cores and speeds up to 1.8 GHz.
 QorIQ Qonverge B4420 and B4860 - with a mix of e6500 cores and StarCore SC3900 DSPs for high end telecom applications such as 4G/LTE macrocells running at 1.6 and 1.8 GHz.

See also 
 QorIQ
 PowerPC e5500
 powerpc-notebook.org homepage — The project to create a laptop based on the NXP QorIQ T2080, a PowerPC e6500 based processor

References

 Freescale Drives Embedded Multicore Innovation with New QorIQ Advanced Multiprocessing Series
 QorIQ Communications Platforms

E6500
Freescale microprocessors
Power microprocessors